Scopula gilva is a moth of the family Geometridae. It is endemic to Japan.

References

Moths described in 1993
gilva
Moths of Japan